Charles Louis, Duke of Schleswig-Holstein-Sonderburg-Beck (German: Karl Ludwig Herzog von Schleswig-Holstein-Sonderburg-Beck; 18 September 1690 – 22 September 1774) was a Lieutenant General in the Prussian Army and Governor of Reval (Tallinn) in the Governorate of Estonia.

Life 
Charles Louis was born as the second son of Frederick Louis, Duke of Schleswig-Holstein-Sonderburg-Beck (1653-1728) and his wife, Princess Louise Charlotte of Schleswig-Holstein-Sonderburg-Augustenburg (1658-1740).

Biography
In 1723, he converted to Roman Catholicism. Charles Louis became the titular Duke of Schleswig-Holstein-Sonderburg-Beck in 1757 after his nephew Colonel Frederick William III died in the Battle of Prague without leaving a male heir. He was appointed field marshal by Czar Peter III of Russia in 1762, but he refused because of his age.

Marriage and issue
In 1730 he married Countess Anna Karolina Orzelska in Dresden, Electorate of Saxony. She was an illegitimate daughter of August II the Strong, Prince-Elector of Saxony and King of Poland and Grand-Duke of Lithuania, by his French mistress Henriette Rénard. Anna sought divorce after just three years of what proved to be an unhappy arranged marriage. They had one son: 
 Duke Karl Frederick (b. Dresden, 5 January 1732 - d. Strassburg, 21 February 1772), General Major of the Saxon Army; Karl never married and did not have issue

Death
Charles Louis died in 1774 in Königsberg, East Prussia.  He was succeeded by Peter August of Schleswig-Holstein-Sonderburg-Beck.

Ancestry

References

External links 
 Short biography

1690 births
1774 deaths
18th-century German military personnel
Converts to Roman Catholicism from Lutheranism
Dukes of Schleswig-Holstein-Sonderburg-Beck
Nobility from Königsberg
People from Tallinn
People from the Governorate of Estonia
Lieutenant generals of Prussia
Baltic nobility
Baltic-German people
Military personnel from Königsberg